John William Heilman is an American municipal politician and city councilmember of West Hollywood, California.  He has served in the capacity of mayor multiple times since 1985.

Education 
A native of Cleveland, Ohio, Heilman graduated with a degree in journalism from Northwestern University. He then moved to Southern California to attend the University of Southern California Law School. He was an editor of the school's Law Review and graduated in 1982. Councilmember Heilman also received a master's degree in public administration and a master's degree in real estate development from the University of Southern California. Councilmember Heilman is also a law school professor, and currently teaches at both Southwestern Law School and the USC Law School.

Public service 
Heilman was active in the incorporation of the City of West Hollywood. He was elected to the city's first city council in November 1984, and has served almost continuously since then. Heilman lost re-election in March 2015, but months later won a special election to fill a seat vacated by Jeff Prang, who resigned to become L.A. County assessor. John Heilman was chosen as the city's second mayor in 1985, and also served as mayor in 1990, 1995, 1999, 2001, 2006, 2010 and 2017. He began his most recent turn as mayor in April 2017.

Heilman was defeated in his bid for re-election in November 2020.

Since his earliest days on the city council, one of Heilman's main concerns has been domestic partner rights. Heilman was instrumental in the establishment of West Hollywood's domestic partnership registration program that permitted city employee partners to register and obtain domestic partner benefits for same-sex couples and seniors, regardless of gender, who are at least 62.5 years old and living together.

Heilman is a past board member of the American Civil Liberties Union of Southern California.

Openly gay, Heilman is also the past president of the Gay, Lesbian and Bisexual Local Officials Group and past co-chair of the International Network of Lesbian and Gay Officials. His 2007 re-election campaign has won the support of the Gay & Lesbian Victory Fund. He holds an active membership of the Stonewall Democratic Club. Heilman is also a member of the Coalition for Economic Survival.

As a result of Heilman's leadership on the issue of AIDS, he received the U.S. Conference of Mayor's Award in 1990.

Heilman is an avid runner and was responsible for bringing Frontrunners Annual 5k/10k Pride Run to West Hollywood as part of the city's annual Christopher Street West/CSW Pride event held in June of each year. Currently, he teaches law at both Southwestern Law School and the University of Southern California Law School.

References

External links 
 Bio of John Heilman from the City of West Hollywood website 
John Heilman's Official Website

Living people
Gay politicians
Politicians from Cleveland
LGBT mayors of places in the United States
People from Greater Los Angeles
USC Gould School of Law alumni
University of Southern California faculty
Mayors of places in California
California city council members
Year of birth missing (living people)
LGBT people from Ohio